Nina Stanger (1943–1999) was a prominent barrister in London during the 1960s.

Career 
Stanger defended women accused of terrorist offences. She represented people in cases including the Miss World bombing, the Angry Brigade trial, and the trial of the Price sisters for the Old Bailey bombing.

Personal life 
Married to Steven Lukes, she had three children with him: Daniel (born 1977), Michael (born 1979), and Alexandra (born 1981). She moved to Italy with her family in 1987.

References

English barristers
1943 births
1999 deaths
British women lawyers
20th-century women lawyers
20th-century English lawyers